Deudorix galathea, the red-edged playboy, is a butterfly in the family Lycaenidae. It is found in Senegal, Guinea, Sierra Leone, Liberia, Ivory Coast, Ghana, Nigeria (south and the Cross River loop), Cameroon and Gabon.

References

Butterflies described in 1821
Deudorigini
Deudorix